The Wilson Journal of Ornithology (until 2006 The Wilson Bulletin) is a quarterly scientific journal published by the Wilson Ornithological Society. Both the society and its journal were named after American ornithologist Alexander Wilson.

See also
List of ornithology journals

External links
 BioOne: The Wilson Bulletin. Vol. 112-117 (2000–2005); free HTML abstracts, subscription required for PDF fulltexts.
 BioOne: The Wilson Journal of Ornithology. Vol. 118 (2006) onwards; free HTML abstracts, subscription required for PDF fulltexts.
 SORA: The Wilson Bulletin. Vol. 1-111 (1889–1999) free PDF/DejaVu fulltexts.

Journals and magazines relating to birding and ornithology